The Communauté de communes du Canton d'Aumale  is a former intercommunality in the Seine-Maritime département of the Normandy region of northern France. It was created in January 2002. It was merged into the new Communauté de communes interrégionale Aumale - Blangy-sur-Bresle in January 2017.

Participants 
The Communauté de communes comprised the following communes:

Aubéguimont
Aumale
Le Caule-Sainte-Beuve
Conteville
Criquiers
Ellecourt
Haudricourt
Illois
Landes-Vieilles-et-Neuves
Marques
Morienne
Nullemont
Richemont
Ronchois
Vieux-Rouen-sur-Bresle

See also
Communes of the Seine-Maritime department

References 

Aumale